Indiana Armory is a historic National Guard armory located at Indiana, Indiana County, Pennsylvania.  It was designed by Joseph F. Kuntz of Pittsburgh architects W.G. Wilkins Co.  The drill hall was built in 1922, and is a one-story structure with a gambrel roof.  The administration building was added in 1929, and consists of a two-story section with a recessed one-story portion.  The building is a modified "T"-plan in the Moderne style.

It was added to the National Register of Historic Places in 1991.

References

Indiana, Pennsylvania
Armories on the National Register of Historic Places in Pennsylvania
Buildings and structures in Indiana County, Pennsylvania
Government buildings completed in 1929
National Register of Historic Places in Indiana County, Pennsylvania
Moderne architecture in Pennsylvania
Individually listed contributing properties to historic districts on the National Register in Pennsylvania